One True King (OTK), legally OTK Media, Inc., is an American media organization based in Austin, Texas. The organization primarily focuses on online content creation and previously competed professionally in World of Warcraft.

History
One True King, commonly referred to as OTK, was formed on October 11, 2020, by content creators Asmongold, Mizkif, Esfand, Rich Campbell, and Tips Out. In their first video, founding member Asmongold stated, "We came up with this idea of making an org, and building the org around our friends – building the org around friendship in general." The organization has been described by its members as being more of a media production company and lifestyle brand as opposed to being confined to any one game or section on Twitch. The organization has also gained notability for not receiving major backing from corporations as opposed to traditional esports teams.

Alongside the initial announcement of the group, the organization unveiled their professional World of Warcraft roster. The original roster consisted of Trill, Mes, Cdew, and Samiyam. The team competed at Blizzard-sanctioned events for one season during the Shadowlands expansion. On October 27, 2020, the organization announced the addition of streamer Nick Polom, also known by his online alias Nmplol, as a content creator and co-owner. In December 2020, OTK partnered with Complexity Gaming's World of Warcraft team in providing coverage of the game's Race to World First event, holding daily roundtable discussions about the race.

One True King won the "Best Content Organization" award at The Streamer Awards on March 12, 2022.

In June 2022, the group announced a partnership with content production company WePlay Esports, as well as the unveiling of a Los Angeles-based content studio. The first event held under the partnership was the "OTK Games Expo", which showcased nearly 30 video games from various indie developers.

On August 8, 2022, the group, along with YouTuber and Twitch streamer Cr1TiKaL, announced the founding of Starforge Systems, a technology company focused on building computers that was quickly met with backlash due to the allegedly high prices of their products. The company responded by decreasing their prices by $100.

On September 20, 2022, co-owner Mizkif was placed on leave by the group after a series of clips and other content involving him, which included him allegedly downplaying an incident of sexual assault, as well as racist and homophobic comments made from 2018 to 2019, came to light. On December 31, 2022, he was reinstated by the group, though he remains suspended from his board related duties as a result of his comments.

On December 16, 2022, co-owner Rich Campbell announced his resignation from the organization in light of sexual assault allegations. Soon after this, the official OTK Twitter account announced that Jschlatt will be departing the organization on December 23. He will, however, continue as an advisor for the YouTube team and have a stake in Starforge Systems.

On January 24, 2023, BruceDropEmOff left the organization. Three days later, he was indefinitely suspended from Twitch citing ban evasion.

On January 31, 2023, Emiru was announced as a new co-owner of the organization. She was previously in the organization solely as a content creator. 
It was also announced on the same day that ExtraEmily is joining the organization as a content creator.

Philanthropy
One True King has held several charity streams benefitting non-profit organization Games for Love. Their first charity stream took place on November 23, 2020. Over $250,000 was raised through opening rare Pokémon cards. The stream averaged 70,000 viewers. A second charity stream for Games for Love took place on March 22, 2021, raising $600,000.
Their third charity stream took place over a two-day period from June 22–23, 2021, raising $593,596.

In March 2022, One True King held two charity streams benefitting relief efforts for those affected by the 2022 Russian invasion of Ukraine, raising over $500,000.

Members

Timeline

Current members

Former members

World of Warcraft

Shadowlands (2021) 
In January 2021, the organization's World of Warcraft team participated in the first edition of the Shadowlands Arena World Championship. They finished 3rd among North American teams. At cup 2, One True King made it to the finals of the North American bracket, losing to Kawhi 1–4. At the cup 3, One True King made it to the semi-finals, losing to Cloud9 0–3. At the fourth and final cup of season one, One True King made it to the quarterfinals, losing to Charlotte Phoenix 1–3. The team finished second in the standings with 300 points, qualifying them for the Regional Circuit Championships. One True King finished the circuit with 8 points, tying for the 3rd place spot in North America with Golden Guardians and advancing them to the Arena World Championship Season 1 Finals. They made it to the semi-finals, losing to Cloud9 and finishing the season at 3rd place.

On June 11, 2021, Cdew announced via Twitter that the organization decided not to renew the teams' contracts for the upcoming expansion.

Awards and nominations

References

American Internet groups
Esports teams based in the United States
Esports teams established in 2020
Gaming organizations
Streamer Award winners
Online media collectives
World of Warcraft teams
Twitch (service) streamers
2020 establishments in Texas
Companies based in Austin, Texas